Grégory Leca (born 22 August 1980) is a French former professional footballer who played for FC Metz and Stade Malherbe Caen. He featured as a midfielder and as a defender.

Career statistics

Club

References

External links
 

1980 births
Living people
Association football midfielders
Footballers from Metz
French footballers
FC Metz players
Stade Malherbe Caen players
Ligue 1 players
Ligue 2 players
Championnat National players
Corsica international footballers
French people of Corsican descent